Through the Dark is a 1924 American silent mystery crime drama film directed by George W. Hill, and starring Colleen Moore and Forrest Stanley as the popular jewel thief and sometimes detective character Boston Blackie. The film's scenario, written by Frances Marion, is based on the short story "The Daughter of Mother McGinn" by Jack Boyle, which appeared in serial form in Cosmopolitan. The film was produced by William Randolph Hearst's Cosmopolitan Productions and distributed through Goldwyn Pictures.

Plot
As described in a film magazine review, during a rebellion of prisoners at the San Quentin State Prison, Boston Blackie makes a lightning escape aided by Mary McGinn while chased prison guards. Mary is a school girl, unaware that her brothers are crooks. She is expelled from school. Blackie rejoins his gang and takes refuge in Mother McGinn's house, where he again meets Mary. She devotes herself to making Blackie go straight and wins her point.

Cast

Censorship
The film was banned by the British Board of Film Censors upon its release for its depiction of unspecified "taboo" subject matter.

Preservation
An incomplete print of Through the Dark is preserved at the Library of Congress.

References

External links

Lantern slide

1924 films
1924 crime drama films
1920s mystery drama films
American crime drama films
American independent films
American mystery drama films
American silent feature films
American black-and-white films
Films based on short fiction
Films directed by George Hill
Goldwyn Pictures films
1920s independent films
Boston Blackie films
1920s American films
Silent American drama films
Silent mystery films